John M. Detling (1880–1948) was a member of the Wisconsin State Assembly.

Biography
Detling was born on June 21, 1880 in Sheboygan, Wisconsin. His father, Valentine Detling, was also a member of the Assembly. In 1905, Detling graduated from the University of Wisconsin Law School. He died on January 8, 1948.

Career
Detling was elected to the Assembly in 1906. He was a Democrat.

References

External links

Politicians from Sheboygan, Wisconsin
Democratic Party members of the Wisconsin State Assembly
Wisconsin lawyers
University of Wisconsin Law School alumni
1880 births
1948 deaths
Burials in Wisconsin
20th-century American politicians
20th-century American lawyers